The 2011–12 season was Juventus Football Club's 114th in existence and fifth consecutive season in the top flight of Italian football. In Serie A, the club won their first legitimate league title since 2003; they had initially won two Serie A titles in the meantime (2004–05 and 2005–06) but were stripped of both as a result of the Calciopoli scandal.

Season review
Former club captain and fan favourite Antonio Conte was officially appointed as the new manager on 31 May 2011, taking over the post previously left vacant following the sacking of Luigi Delneri. It was Conte's first appointment at a major Serie A club; he previously managed Siena, Arezzo, Atalanta, and Bari respectively, winning two Serie A promotions in the process (with Bari and Siena). His arrival coincided with the acquisitions of Andrea Pirlo and Arturo Vidal, both top-class midfielders. The 2011–12 season also marked the opening of a new stadium, named Juventus Stadium. It was officially opened on 11 September, in a match against Parma that ended 4–1. First half of league saw Juventus gain several key-wins such as over Milan and Inter, both beaten in the month of October.

Despite criticism for lacking a centre-forward, a role sometimes covered by Matri, the team was able to score regularly with its other players. Juventus reached first place, and the title was certainly won on the penultimate game of the season due to a 2–0 success away to Cagliari – the first time in nine years. Juventus ended the season without any losses, breaking a record for the 20-team league format in Italy. Conte's squad also played the Coppa Italia final, losing to Napoli 2–0 — the first and only seasonal loss. This match was the last for Juventus for Alessandro Del Piero, who seven days before had scored his last goal in a 3–1 win over Atalanta.

After a 3–1 win in the final matchday against Atalanta, Juventus became the first team to go the season unbeaten in the current 38-game format.

Club

Coaching staff

Medical staff

Management

Sport department

Other information

Kit
The kits for the 2011–12 season, made by Nike, were revealed on 6 July 2011 at the new stadium inside the Bianconeris dressing room. The home kit is a reinterpretation of the traditional black and white stripes in order to guarantee a 3D effect. The away shirt is bright pink, dominated by a large black star. As in the previous season, the home shirt sponsor is BetClic, while for the away kit the sponsor is Balocco. The white away kit used in the previous season is now the third kit. Official club jersey numbers for the 2011–12 season were presented on 20 August 2011.

Players

Squad information
Players and squad numbers last updated on 31 January 2012.
Note: Flags indicate national team as has been defined under FIFA eligibility rules. Players may hold more than one non-FIFA nationality.

Transfers

In

Out

Pre-season and friendlies

Competitions

Serie A

League table

Results summary

Results by round

Matches

Coppa Italia

Juventus started the Coppa Italia directly in the round of 16, as one of the eight best seeded teams.

Statistics
{|class="wikitable" style="text-align: center;"
|-
! !! Total !! Home !! Away !! Neutral
|-
|align=left| Games played || 43 || 22 || 20 || 1
|-
|align=left| Games won    || 26 || 15 || 11 || 0
|-
|align=left| Games drawn  || 16 || 7 || 9 || 0
|-
|align=left| Games lost   || 1 || 0 || 0 || 1
|-
|align=left| Biggest win  || 5–0 v Fiorentina || 4–0 v Roma || 5–0 v Fiorentina || n/a
|-
|align=left| Biggest loss || 0–2 v Napoli || n/a || n/a || 0–2 v Napoli
|-
|align=left| Biggest win (League) || 5–0 v Fiorentina || 4–0 v Roma || 5–0 v Fiorentina || –
|-
|align=left| Biggest win (Cup) || 3–0 v Roma || 3–0 v Roma || 2–1 v AC Milan || n/a
|-
|align=left| Biggest loss (League) || n/a || n/a || n/a || –
|-
|align=left| Biggest loss (Cup) || 0–2 v Napoli || n/a || n/a || 0–2 v Napoli
|-
|align=left| Clean sheets || 21 || 8 || 13 || 0
|-
|align=left| Goals scored || 77 || 47 || 30 || 0
|-
|align=left| Goals conceded || 26 || 15 || 9 || 2
|-
|align=left| Goal difference || +51 || +32 || +21 || -2
|-
|-
|-
|align=left| Yellow cards || 82 || 37 || 42 || 3
|-
|align=left| Red cards || 5 || 2 || 2 || 1
|-
|align=left| Most appearances ||align=left|Pirlo (41)||align=left|Barzagli (21)||align=left|Pirlo (20) || 14 players (1)
|-
|align=left| Top scorer ||align=left|MarchisioMatriVučinić (10)||align=left|Marchisio (8)||align=left|Vučinić (6) || n/a
|-
|align=left |Worst discipline ||align=left|Vidal 13  1 ||align=left|Marchisio 4 ||align=left|Vidal 10  1  || Quagliarella 1 
|-
|align=left|Penalties for || 2/4 (%) || 2/3 (%) || 0/1 (%) || 0/0
|-
|align=left|Penalties against || 2/4 (%) || 1/1 (%)  || 0/2 (%) || 1/1 (%)
|-
|align=left| League points || 84/114 (%) || 45/57 (%) || 39/57 (%) || –
|-
|align=left| Winning rate|| % || % || % || 0%
|-

Appearances, goals, and disciplinary record
{| class="wikitable sortable" style="font-size: 95%"
! width="3%" align="center"| No.
! width="3%" align="center"| Pos.
! width="15%" align="center"| Player
! width=60 |
! width=60 |
! width=60 |
! width=60 |
! width=60 |
! width=60 |
! width=60 |
! width=60 |
! width=60 |
! width=60 |
! width=60 |
! width=60 |
|-
| 1||0GK|| || 35 || -16 || 0 || 0 || 0 || 0 || 0 || 0 || 35 || -16 || 0 || 0|-
|2||DF|| || 0 || 0 || 0 || 0 || 0 || 0 || 0 || 0 || 0 || 0 || 0 || 0|-
| 3||DF|| || 34 || 2 || 7 || 0 || 3 || 0 || 0 || 0 || 37 || 2 || 7 || 0|-
| 4||DF|| || 11 || 1 || 0 || 0 || 3 || 2 || 0 || 0 || 14 || 3 || 0 || 0|-
|5||EMF|| || 8 || 0 || 0 || 0 || 1 || 0 || 1 || 0 || 9 || 0 || 1 || 0|-
| 6||DF|| || 2 || 0 || 0 || 0 || 0 || 0 || 0 || 0 || 2 || 0 || 0 || 0|-
| 7||EMF|| || 31 || 6 || 6 || 0 || 2 || 0 || 0 || 0 || 33 || 6 || 6 || 0|-
| 8||EMF|| || 36 || 9 || 7 || 0 || 3 || 1 || 1 || 0 || 39 || 10 || 8 || 0|-
|9||FW|| || 0 || 0 || 0 || 0 || 0 || 0 || 0 || 0 || 0 || 0 || 0 || 0|-
|10||FW|| || 23 || 3 || 0 || 0 || 5 || 2 || 0 || 0 || 28 || 5 || 0 || 0|-
|11||DF|| || 21 || 1 || 3 || 1 || 2 || 0 || 0 || 0 || 23 || 1 || 3 || 1|-
|13||0GK|| || 0 || 0 || 0 || 0 || 0 || 0 || 0 || 0 || 0 || 0 || 0 || 0|-
|14||FW|| || 32 || 9 || 1 || 1 || 3 || 1 || 1 || 0 || 35 || 10 || 2 || 1|-
|15||DF|| || 35 || 1 || 3 || 0 || 4 || 0 || 1 || 0 || 39 || 1 || 4 || 0|-
|17||EMF|| || 4 || 0 || 0 || 0 || 1 || 0 || 0 || 0 || 5 || 0 || 0 || 0|-
|18||FW|| || 23 || 4 || 4 || 0 || 4 || 0 || 1 || 1 || 27 || 4 || 5 || 1|-
|19||DF|| || 32 || 2 || 6 || 1 || 5 || 0 || 1 || 0 || 37 || 2 || 7 || 1|-
|20||FW|| || 0 || 0 || 0 || 0 || 0 || 0 || 0 || 0 || 0 || 0 || 0 || 0|-
|20||MF||  || 6 || 1 || 0 || 0 || 1 || 0 || 0 || 0 || 7 || 1 || 0 || 0|-
|21||EMF|| || 37 || 3 || 6 || 0 || 4 || 0 || 0 || 0 || 41 || 3 || 6 || 0|-
|22||EMF|| || 33 || 7 || 12 || 1 || 2 || 0 || 1 || 0 || 35 || 7 || 13 || 1|-
|23||FW|| || 13 || 2 || 1 || 0 || 4 || 0 || 2 || 0 || 17 || 2 || 3 || 0|-
|24||EMF|| || 23 || 1 || 3 || 0 || 4 || 2 || 0 || 0 || 27 || 3 || 3 || 0|-
|26||DF|| || 36 || 2 || 6 || 0 || 3 || 0 || 0 || 0 || 39 || 2 || 6 || 0|-
|27||EMF|| || 7 || 1 || 0 || 0 || 2 || 0 || 1 || 0 || 9 || 1 || 1 || 0|-
|28||EMF|| || 14 || 1 || 0 || 0 || 4 || 0 || 1 || 0 || 18 || 1 || 1 || 0|-
|30||0GK|| || 3 || -4 || 0 || 0 || 5 || -6 || 1 || 0 || 8 || -10 || 1 || 0|-
|32||FW|| || 31 || 10 || 4 || 0 || 1 || 0 || 0 || 0 || 32 || 10 || 4 || 0|-
|33||DF|| || 0 || 0 || 0 || 0 || 1 || 0 || 0 || 0 || 1 || 0 || 0 || 0|-
|34||EMF|| || 3 || 1 || 0 || 0 || 3 || 0 || 0 || 0 || 6 || 1 || 0 || 0|-
|38||FW|| Amauri|| 0 || 0 || 0 || 0 || 0 || 0 || 0 || 0 || 0 || 0 || 0 || 0|-class="sortbottom"
| || ||Own goals for || - || 1 || - || - || - || 1 || - || - || - ||2'|| - || -
|-

Goalscorers

Last updated: 20 May 2012

See also
List of unbeaten football club seasons

References

Juventus F.C. seasons
Juventus
Italian football championship-winning seasons